Riste is a given name and surname. Notable people with the name include:

Given name
 Riste Naumov (born 1981), Macedonian former football player
 Riste Pandev (born 1994), Macedonian sprinter
 Riste Stefanov (born 1983), Macedonian former basketball player

Surname
 Olav Riste (1933–2015), Norwegian historian